TVP3 Szczecin is one of the regional branches of the TVP, Poland's public television broadcaster. It serves the entire West Pomeranian Voivodeship.

External links

Programs 
 Obiektyw Regionalna
 Wokół nas

Programs nationwide 
 ''Śmiechu warte (America's Funniest Home Videos) TVP1

Telewizja Polska
Television channels and stations established in 1960
Mass media in Szczecin